Barbara Pierre (born April 28, 1986) is a Haitian-born American track and field sprint athlete who competed internationally for the United States. Her specialty is the 60-meter dash and the 100-meter dash. She had her highest world ranking in 2013, when she was the fourth fastest sprinter in the world over 100 m with her personal best of 10.85 seconds.

Pierre represented Haiti at the 2008 Summer Olympics in Beijing. She competed at the 100 m sprint and placed fourth in her first round heat, which normally meant elimination. However, her time of 11.52 was among the ten fastest losing times, resulting in a second round spot. There she failed to qualify for the semi finals as her time of 11.56 was the fifth time of her race.

At the 2015 Pan American Games, she set the games record of 10.92 seconds in the preliminary round. In the final, she was slightly slower and went home with the bronze medal.

Pierre would continue to compete until the age of 35 when she would retire and take up coaching at her alma mater St. Augustine University as a Volunteer Assistant.

Personal records
50-meter dash – 6.22 (2012)
60-meter dash – 7.00 (2016)
100-meter dash – 10.85 (2013)
200-meter dash – 23.23 (2010)
200-meter dash indoor – 23.62 (2010)

Haitian national records
100-meter dash – 11.18 (2009) 
60-meter dash – 7.18 (2010)

International competitions

See also
List of Haitian Americans

Notes
 The IAAF lists Pierre's birth year as 1986, but other sources state the year as 1987.

References

External links

 
 
 
 
 

1986 births
Living people
Sportspeople from Port-au-Prince
Track and field athletes from North Carolina
American female sprinters
Haitian female sprinters
Olympic athletes of Haiti
Athletes (track and field) at the 2008 Summer Olympics
World Athletics Indoor Championships winners
Pan American Games gold medalists for the United States
Pan American Games bronze medalists for the United States
Pan American Games medalists in athletics (track and field)
Athletes (track and field) at the 2011 Pan American Games
Athletes (track and field) at the 2015 Pan American Games
Haitian emigrants to the United States
Pan American Games silver medalists for the United States
People from Knightdale, North Carolina
USA Indoor Track and Field Championships winners
Medalists at the 2011 Pan American Games
Medalists at the 2015 Pan American Games
Olympic female sprinters
21st-century American women